United Left/The Greens–Assembly for Andalusia (. IULV–CA) is the Andalusian federation of the Spanish left wing political and social movement United Left. Toni Valero is the current General Coordinator. It is a current part of the electoral coalition Forward Andalusia, whose parliamentary spokesperson, Inmaculada Nieto, is also an affiliate member. The major member of this movement is the Communist Party of Andalusia (PCA, Andalusian federation of the Communist Party of Spain).

History
Assembly for Andalusia appeared in 1984 as a proposal of the PCA to form a permanent coalition with other left-wing forces. The federation was created in 1986.

In February 2015 the Unitarian Candidacy of Workers (CUT), the second most important political party of IULV-CA at the time, left IULV-CA because of their disagreement with the "policy of pacts" with the PSOE.

Electoral performance

Parliament of Andalusia

Cortes Generales

 * Within Unidos Podemos for Andalusia.

European Parliament

 * Within Unidas Podemos Cambiar Europa.

Notes

References

External links
Official page

Andalusia
Political parties in Andalusia